Stina Gardell (born 28 March 1990 in Stockholm) is a Swedish Olympic medley swimmer. She swam for Sweden at the 2012 and 2016 Olympics.  She attends university, and swims from, the USA's University of Southern California.

At the 2012 Olympics she finished 14th in Women's 400 Individual Medley and 20th in the 200 m individual medley.  At the 2016 Olympics she finished in 20th in the 200 m individual medley.

References

Living people
Olympic swimmers of Sweden
Swimmers at the 2012 Summer Olympics
Swimmers at the 2016 Summer Olympics
Swedish female medley swimmers
1990 births
Spårvägens SF swimmers
Swimmers from Stockholm
21st-century Swedish women